Farthest Reach is a 2005 fantasy novel by Richard Baker, set in the Dungeons & Dragons Forgotten Realms fictional universe. It is the second novel in the "Last Mythal" series.

Plot
On the heels of her failed assault of Evereska, the demonelf Sarya Dlardrageth retreats in order to regroup. She summons a powerful Outer Planes denizen named Malkizid to her aid, who advises her to make the remaining elven army come to her by inhabiting the site of their most costly defeat - the legendary ruins of Myth Drannor. With the elven army weary, Araevin and the elven leaders must convince the defenders to rally and defeat the demonelf menace forever.

Publication history
2005, USA, Wizards of the Coast , Pub date 1 July 2005, Paperback

Reception
One reviewer stated: "Farthest Reach is a great sequel, with a problem that continues to hamper the trilogy. The characters are bland and have almost no personalities. It’s amazing that this book still is really good, even with horrible characters that harm the overall experience."

References

2005 American novels

American fantasy novels
Forgotten Realms novels